Grass Soup  is a semi-autobiographical account of the life of Zhang Xianliang during his 22 years in prison in Mao's China.

See also

Anti-Rightist Movement
Cultural Revolution

References

Chinese-language books